Kannur District or Cannanore District is one of the 14 districts in the state of Kerala, India. The town of Kannur is the district headquarters, and gives the district its name. The old name 'Cannanore' is the anglicised form of the Malayalam name Kannur.

 Peralasseri Ambalam
 Makrery Ambalam
 Muthappan temple
 Rajarajeshwara Temple
 Kunnathoor padi
St. Mary's Forane Church Edoor (Iritty).

See also
Kannur town
Kannur district
Temples of Kerala

Hindu temples in Kannur district